Julian Paul Assange (Hawkins; born 3 July 1971) is an Australian editor, publisher, hacker, and cypherpunk activist. He has a previous conviction for hacking, dating back to 1996. He founded WikiLeaks in 2006; the organisation came to international attention in 2010 when it published a series of leaks provided by U.S. Army intelligence analyst Chelsea Manning. After the 2010 leaks, the United States government launched a criminal investigation into Julian Assange and WikiLeaks.

In November 2010, Sweden issued a European arrest warrant for Assange over allegations of sexual misconduct, which he denied and said that the warrant was a pretext for a further extradition to the United States over his role in the publication of secret US military documents. After losing his battle against extradition to Sweden, he breached bail and took refuge in the Embassy of Ecuador in London in June 2012. He was granted asylum by Ecuador in August 2012 on the grounds of political persecution and fears he might be extradited to the United States. Swedish prosecutors dropped their investigation in 2019, saying their evidence had "weakened considerably due to the long period of time that has elapsed since the events in question".

On 11 April 2019, Assange's asylum was withdrawn following a series of disputes with Ecuadorian authorities. The police were invited into the embassy and he was arrested. He was found guilty of breaching the Bail Act and sentenced to 50 weeks in prison. The United States government unsealed an indictment charging Assange with conspiracy to commit computer intrusion related to the leaks provided by Manning. In May 2019 and June 2020, the United States government unsealed new indictments against Assange, charging him with violating the Espionage Act of 1917 and alleging a history of conspiring with hackers. Response to the indictments has been mixed. Editors from newspapers have been less critical or supportive of the hacking charge, but joined with press freedom organisations to criticise the government's decision to charge Assange under the Espionage Act, characterising it as an attack on freedom of the press.

Assange has been confined in Belmarsh, a category A prison, in London since April 2019. On 4 January 2021, UK District Judge Vanessa Baraitser ruled against the United States' request to extradite Assange, citing concerns over Assange's mental health and risk of suicide. On 6 January 2021, Assange was denied bail, pending an appeal by the United States. On 10 December 2021, the High Court in London ruled that Assange could be extradited to the US to face the charges. On 17 June 2022, Home Secretary Priti Patel approved the extradition. On 1 July 2022, it was announced that Assange had formally appealed against the extradition order.

Early life
Assange was born Julian Paul Hawkins on 3 July 1971 in Townsville, Queensland, to Christine Ann Hawkins (b. 1951), a visual artist, and John Shipton, an anti-war activist and builder. The couple separated before their son was born. When Julian was a year old, his mother married Brett Assange, an actor with whom she ran a small theatre company and whom Julian Assange regards as his father (choosing Assange as his surname). Christine and Brett Assange divorced around 1979. Christine then became involved with Leif Meynell, also known as Leif Hamilton, whom Julian Assange later described as "a member of an Australian cult" called The Family. Meynell and Christine Assange separated in 1982.

Julian Assange had a nomadic childhood, living in more than 30 Australian towns and cities by the time he reached his mid-teens, when he settled with his mother and half-brother in Melbourne. Assange attended many schools, including Goolmangar Primary School in New South Wales (1979–1983) and Townsville State High School in Queensland as well as being schooled at home.

Assange studied programming, mathematics, and physics at Central Queensland University (1994) and the University of Melbourne (2003–2006), but did not complete a degree.

Hacking, programming, and early activism 
By 1987, aged 16, Assange had became a skilled hacker under the name Mendax, taken from Horace's splendide mendax (nobly lying, nobly untruthful, noble liar or delightfully deceptive). Assange had a self-imposed set of ethics: he didn't damage or crash systems or data he hacked, and he shared information. The Sydney Morning Herald later opined that he had become one of Australia's "most notorious hackers", and The Guardian said that by 1991 he was "probably Australia's most accomplished hacker". Assange's official biography on WikiLeaks called him Australia's "most famous ethical computer hacker", and the earliest version said he "hacked thousands of systems, including the Pentagon" when he was younger.

He and two others, known as "Trax" and "Prime Suspect", formed a hacking group they called "the International Subversives". According to NPR, David Leigh, and Luke Harding, Assange may have been involved in the WANK (Worms Against Nuclear Killers) hack at NASA in 1989, but this has never been proven. The 2010 Swedish television documentary WikiRebels, which was made with Assange's cooperation, also hinted he was involved.

In mid-1991, the three hackers began targeting MILNET, a secret data network used by the US military, where Assange found reports he said showed the US military was hacking other parts of itself. Assange found a backdoor and later said they "had control over it for two years." Assange wrote a program called Sycophant that allowed the International Subversives to conduct "massive attacks on the US military". The International Subversives regularly hacked into systems belonging to a "who's who of the U.S. military-industrial complex" like the Australian Federal Police, Australia National University, NASA, the Department of Defence, the Stanford Research Institute, Lawrence Livermore National Laboratory, and the Los Alamos National Laboratory.

The three hackers discovered that the Australian Federal Police had set up an investigation called Operation Weather that targeted the group. The hackers tried to monitor the investigation. In September 1991, Assange was discovered hacking into the Melbourne master terminal of Nortel, a Canadian multinational telecommunications corporation. Another member of the International Subversives turned himself and the others in, and the Australian Federal Police tapped Assange's phone line (he was using a modem), raided his home at the end of October and eventually charged him in 1994 with 31 counts of hacking and related crimes.

In December 1996, facing 10 years in prison, he struck a plea deal and pleaded guilty to 24 hacking charges (the others were dropped); he was ordered to pay a fine of A$2,100 and released on a good behaviour bond. The judge called the charges "quite serious" and initially thought a jail term would be necessary but ultimately sentenced Assange to a fine and a good behaviour bond because of his disrupted childhood and the absence of malicious or mercenary intent, which the prosecution said was "simply an arrogance and a desire to show off his computer skills". According to The New Republic, "the experience set him on the intellectual path" leading him to found WikiLeaks.
In 1993, Assange provided technical advice and support to help the Victoria Police Child Exploitation Unit to prosecute individuals responsible for publishing and distributing child pornography. His lawyers said he was pleased to be able to assist emphasising that he received no personal benefit for this and was not an informer. His role in helping the police was brought up during his 1996 sentencing on computer hacking charges.

In the same year, he took over running one of the first public Internet service providers in Australia, Suburbia Public Access Network when its original owner, Mark Dorset, moved to Sydney. He joined the cypherpunk mailing list in late 1993 or early 1994. An archive of his cypherpunks mailing list posts is at the Mailing List Archives. He began programming in 1994, authoring or co-authoring the TCP port scanner Strobe (1995), patches to the open-source database management system PostgreSQL (1996), the Usenet caching software NNTPCache (1996), the Rubberhose deniable encryption system (1997) and Surfraw, a command-line interface for web-based search engines (2000). During this period of time he also moderated the AUCRYPTO forum, ran Best of Security which was a website "giving advice on computer security" that had 5,000 subscribers in 1996, and contributed research to Suelette Dreyfus's Underground (1997), a book about Australian hackers including the International Subversives. In 1998, he co-founded the "network intrusion detection technologies" company Earthmen Technology which developed linux kernel hacking.

Assange stated that he registered the domain leaks.org in 1999, but "didn't do anything with it". He did publicise a patent granted to the National Security Agency in August 1999, for voice-data harvesting technology saying "This patent should worry people. Everyone's overseas phone calls are or may soon be tapped, transcribed and archived in the bowels of an unaccountable foreign spy agency."

WikiLeaks

Early publications

Assange and a few others established WikiLeaks in Iceland in 2006. Assange became a member of the organisation's advisory board and described himself as the editor-in-chief. From 2007 to 2010, Assange travelled continuously on WikiLeaks business, visiting Africa, Asia, Europe, and North America. During this time, the organisation published internet censorship lists, leaks, and classified media from anonymous sources. The publications include revelations about drone strikes in Yemen, corruption across the Arab world, extrajudicial executions by Kenyan police, 2008 Tibetan unrest in China, and the "Petrogate" oil scandal in Peru.

WikiLeaks' international profile increased in 2008 when a Swiss bank, Julius Baer, tried unsuccessfully to block the site's publication of bank records. Assange commented that financial institutions ordinarily "operate outside the rule of law", and received extensive legal support from free-speech and civil rights groups. Over the next several years, WikiLeaks continued publishing news leaks.

Manning leaks
The material WikiLeaks published between 2006 and 2009 attracted various degrees of international attention, but after it began publishing documents supplied by U.S. Army intelligence analyst Chelsea Manning, WikiLeaks became a household name.

In March 2010, a member of WikiLeaks using the handle "Ox", widely believed to be Julian Assange, talked to Chelsea Manning by text chat while she was submitting leaks to WikiLeaks. The US points to these chat logs in the 2018 indictment of Julian Assange and filed an affidavit which said they were able to identify Assange as the person chatting with Manning using hints he made during the chats and that Manning identified him as Assange to Adrian Lamo.

In the chat logs, Manning asks Assange if he was "any good at LM hash cracking", which would decrypt passwords. Assange said he was, and told Manning about rainbow tables that WikiLeaks used to crack hashes and find passwords associated with them. The exchange was cited as evidence against Assange for the 2018 charge of conspiracy to commit computer intrusion and as evidence that WikiLeaks was more like an intelligence agency than a publisher.

Assange also told Manning that WikiLeaks had four months of phone telephone calls from the Icelandic Parliament, saying the "Nixon tapes got nothing on us." When Manning told Assange she had nothing else to submit to WikiLeaks, he replied that "curious eyes never run dry in my experience." During her court martial, Manning said she downloaded the detainee assessment briefs (DABs) for Guantanamo Bay after speaking to a member of Wikileaks via a secure online chat log. While discussing files on Guantanamo Bay, Manning asked Assange about detainee assessment briefs. She said that "although he did not believe that they were of political significance, he did believe that they could be used to merge into the general historical account of what occurred at Guantanamo." She added that "after this discussion, I decided to download the data."

Collateral murder video 
In April 2010, WikiLeaks released the Collateral Murder video; it shows United States soldiers fatally shooting 18 civilians from a helicopter in Iraq, including Reuters journalists Namir Noor-Eldeen and his assistant Saeed Chmagh. Reuters had previously made a request to the US government for the video under Freedom of Information but had been denied. Assange and others worked for a week to break the U.S. military's encryption of the video.

Iraq and Afghan War logs 

In October 2010, WikiLeaks published the Iraq War logs, a collection of 391,832 United States Army field reports from the Iraq War covering from 2004 to 2009. Assange said that he hoped the publication would "correct some of that attack on the truth that occurred before the war, during the war, and which has continued after the war".

Regarding his own role within WikiLeaks, he said, "We always expect tremendous criticism. It is my role to be the lightning rod... to attract the attacks against the organization for our work, and that is a difficult role. On the other hand, I get undue credit".

Release of US diplomatic cables 
In November 2010, WikiLeaks published a quarter of a million U.S. diplomatic cables, known as the "Cablegate" files. WikiLeaks initially worked with established Western media organisations, and later with smaller regional media organisations while also publishing the cables upon which their reporting was based. The files show United States espionage against the United Nations and other world leaders, revealed tensions between the U.S. and its allies, and exposed corruption in countries throughout the world as documented by U.S. diplomats, helping to spark the Arab Spring. The Cablegate as well as Iraq and Afghan War releases impacted diplomacy and public opinion globally, with responses varying by region.

Release of unredacted cables 

In 2011 a series of events compromised the security of a WikiLeaks file containing the leaked US diplomatic cables. In August 2010, Assange gave Guardian journalist David Leigh an encryption key and a URL where he could locate the full file. In February 2011 David Leigh and Luke Harding of The Guardian published the encryption key in their book WikiLeaks: Inside Julian Assange's War on Secrecy. Leigh said he believed the key was a temporary one that would expire within days. Wikileaks supporters disseminated the encrypted files to mirror sites in December 2010 after Wikileaks experienced cyber-attacks. When Wikileaks learned what had happened it notified the US State Department. On 25 August 2011, the German magazine Der Freitag published an article giving details which would enable people to piece the information together. On 2 September 2011 Wikileaks made the cables public. The Guardian wrote that the decision to publish the cables was made by Assange alone, a decision that it and its four previous media partners condemned. Glenn Greenwald wrote that "WikiLeaks decided--quite reasonably--that the best and safest course was to release all the cables in full, so that not only the world's intelligence agencies but everyone had them, so that steps could be taken to protect the sources and so that the information in them was equally available". The unredacted cables were released by Cryptome on 1 September, a day before Wikileaks did. The US cited the release in the opening of its request for extradition of Assange, saying his actions put lives at risk. Lawyers for Assange gave evidence it said would show that Assange was careful to protect lives.

Later publications
Over the next several years, WikiLeaks published the Guantanamo Bay files leak, the Syria Files, the Kissinger cables, and the Saudi cables. As of July 2015, Assange said WikiLeaks had published more than ten million documents and associated analyses; he describes it as "a giant library of the world's most persecuted documents".

Legal issues

US criminal investigations

After WikiLeaks released the Manning material, United States authorities began investigating WikiLeaks and Assange to prosecute them under the Espionage Act of 1917. In November 2010, US Attorney-General Eric Holder said there was "an active, ongoing criminal investigation" into WikiLeaks. It emerged from legal documents leaked over the ensuing months that WikiLeaks was being investigated by a federal grand jury in Alexandria, Virginia and the administration urged allies to open criminal investigations of Assange.

In 2010, the FBI told a lawyer for Assange that he wasn't the subject of an investigation. That year the NSA added Assange to its Manhunting Timeline, an annual account of efforts to capture or kill alleged terrorists and others. In 2011, the NSA discussed categorising WikiLeaks as a "malicious foreign actor" for surveillance purposes. In August 2011, WikiLeaks volunteer Sigurdur Thordarson, working in his native Iceland, contacted the FBI and after presenting a copy of Assange's passport at the American embassy, became the first informant to work for the FBI from inside WikiLeaks. He gave the FBI several hard drives he had copied from Assange and core WikiLeaks members.

In December 2011, prosecutors in the Chelsea Manning case revealed the existence of chat logs between Manning and someone they claimed was Assange. Assange said that WikiLeaks has no way of knowing the identity of its sources and that chats with sources, including user-names, were anonymous.  In January 2011, Assange described the allegation that WikiLeaks had conspired with Manning as "absolute nonsense". The logs were presented as evidence during Manning's court-martial in June–July 2013. The prosecution argued that they showed WikiLeaks helping Manning reverse-engineer a password. During her trial, Manning said she acted on her own to send documents to WikiLeaks and no one associated with WikiLeaks pressured her into giving more information.

In 2013, US officials said it was unlikely that the Justice Department would indict Assange for publishing classified documents because it would also have to prosecute the news organisations and writers who published classified material. In June 2013, The New York Times said that court and other documents suggested that Assange was being examined by a grand jury and "several government agencies", including by the FBI. Court documents published in May 2014 suggest that WikiLeaks was under "active and ongoing" investigation at that time. In July 2015, Assange called himself a "wanted journalist" in an open letter to the French president published in Le Monde.

Under the Obama Administration, the Department of Justice did not indict Assange because it was unable to find any evidence that his actions differed from those of a journalist. After President Donald Trump took office, CIA director Mike Pompeo and Attorney General Jeff Sessions stepped up pursuit of Assange.

In April 2017, US officials were preparing to file formal charges against Assange. Assange's indictment was unsealed in 2019 and expanded on later that year and in 2020. The legal scholar Steve Vladeck has pointed out that prosecutors likely accelerated the case in 2019 due to the impending statute of limitations on Assange's largest leaks.

In early 2019, the Mueller report wrote the Special Counsel's office considered charging WikiLeaks or Assange "as conspirators in the computer-intrusion conspiracy and that there were "factual uncertainties" about the role that Assange may have played in the hacks or their distribution that were "the subject of ongoing investigations" by the US Attorney's Office.

Swedish sexual assault allegations

Assange visited Sweden in August 2010. On 20 August, he became the subject of sexual assault allegations from two women who volunteered with WikiLeaks. On 30 August, Assange was questioned by the Stockholm police regarding the allegations, which he denied. European WikiLeaks members were privately concerned that Assange was spreading allegations of dirty tricks. The preliminary investigation was later discontinued, but on 1 September 2010, Överåklagare (Director of Public Prosecution) Marianne Ny decided to resume the preliminary investigation concerning all of the original allegations. Assange left Sweden on 27 September 2010 and was arrested in his absence the same day.

On 18 November 2010, the Swedish police issued an international arrest warrant. Later that day, Assange told journalist Raffi Khatchadourian that Sweden had a "very, very poor judicial system" that he said was driven by a "crazed radical feminist ideology". He also said that the case was a matter of international politics, and referred to Sweden as a "US satrapy". In a later interview he fed criticism of his accusers and said he considered himself victim of radicalism. On 8 December 2010, Assange gave himself up to British police and attended his first extradition hearing, where he was remanded in custody. On 16 December 2010, at the second hearing, he was granted bail by the High Court of Justice and released after his supporters paid £240,000 in cash and sureties. A further hearing on 24 February 2011 ruled that Assange should be extradited to Sweden. This decision was upheld by the High Court on 2 November and by the Supreme Court on 30 May the next year.

Assange said he would go to Sweden if provided with a diplomatic guarantee that he would not be turned over to the United States, to which the Swedish foreign ministry stated that Sweden's legislation does not allow any judicial decision like extradition to be predetermined.

Assange's lawyers invited the Swedish prosecutor four times to come and question him at the embassy, but the offer was refused. In March 2015, after public criticism from other Swedish law practitioners, Ny changed her mind about interrogating Assange, who had taken refuge in the Ecuadorian embassy in London. The UK agreed to the interview in May and reached a deal with Ecuador that included several interview restrictions. These interviews, which began on 14 November 2016, involved the British police, Swedish prosecutors and Ecuadorian officials, and were eventually published online. By that time, the statute of limitations had expired on all three of the less serious allegations. Since the Swedish prosecutor had not interviewed Assange by 18 August 2015, the questioning pertained only to the open investigation of "lesser degree rape".

On 19 May 2017, the Swedish authorities suspended their investigation, saying they could not expect the Ecuadorian Embassy to communicate reliably with Assange with respect to the case. Chief prosecutor Marianne Ny officially revoked his arrest warrant, but said the investigation could still be resumed if Assange visited Sweden before August 2020.

Following Assange's arrest on 11 April 2019, the case was reopened in May 2019 under prosecutor Eva-Marie Persson. On 19 November, she announced that she had discontinued her investigation, saying that although she was confident in the complainant, "the evidence has weakened considerably due to the long period of time that has elapsed".

Ecuadorian embassy period

Entering the embassy

On 19 June 2012, the Ecuadorian foreign minister, Ricardo Patiño, announced that Assange had applied for political asylum, that the Ecuadorian government was considering his request, and that Assange was at the Ecuadorian embassy in London.

Soon after entering the embassy, Assange asked to use the embassy's surveillance equipment to find out who had been harassing him from the street. After he was given permission, a security guard found him using the equipment and tried to stop him. El Pais reported that "they argued and struggled."

Assange and his supporters said he was not concerned about any proceedings in Sweden as such, but said that the Swedish allegations were designed to discredit him and were a pretext for his extradition from Sweden to the United States.

Assange breached his bail conditions by taking up residence in the embassy rather than appearing in court, and faced arrest if he left. Assange's supporters, including journalist Jemima Goldsmith, journalist John Pilger, and filmmaker Ken Loach, forfeited £200,000 in bail and £40,000 as promised sureties. Goldsmith said she was surprised at his asylum bid and she wanted and expected him to face the Swedish allegations but that he had "a real fear of being extradited to the US".

The UK government wrote to Patiño, saying that the police were entitled to enter the embassy and arrest Assange under UK law. Patiño said it was an implied threat, stating that "such actions would be a blatant disregard of the Vienna Convention". Officers of the Metropolitan Police Service were stationed outside the embassy from June 2012 to October 2015 to arrest Assange if he left the embassy, and compel him to attend the extradition appeal hearing. The police officers were withdrawn on grounds of cost in October 2015, but the police said they would still deploy "several overt and covert tactics to arrest him". The Metropolitan Police Service said the cost of the policing for the period was £12.6million.

The Australian attorney-general, Nicola Roxon, wrote to Assange's lawyer saying that Australia would not seek to involve itself in any international exchanges about Assange's future. Prime Minister Julia Gillard said the Australian government had no evidence the US intended to charge and extradite Assange at that time, and Roxon suggested that if Assange was imprisoned in the US, he could apply for an international prisoner transfer to Australia. Assange's lawyers described the letter as a "declaration of abandonment". WikiLeaks insiders stated that Assange decided to seek asylum because he felt abandoned by the Australian government.

On 16 August 2012, Patiño announced that Ecuador was granting Assange political asylum because of the threat represented by the United States secret investigation against him. In its formal statement, Ecuador said that "as a consequence of Assange's determined defense to freedom of expression and freedom of press... in any given moment, a situation may come where his life, safety or personal integrity will be in danger". Ecuadorian President Rafael Correa confirmed on 18 August that Assange could stay at the embassy indefinitely. An office converted into a studio apartment, equipped with a bed, telephone, sun lamp, computer, shower, treadmill, and kitchenette, became his home until 11 April 2019.

Public positions

WikiLeaks Party
Assange stood for the Australian Senate in the 2013 Australian federal election for the newly formed WikiLeaks Party but failed to win a seat. The party experienced internal dissent over its governance and electoral tactics and was deregistered due to low membership numbers in 2015.

Edward Snowden
In 2013, Assange and others in WikiLeaks helped whistleblower Edward Snowden flee from US law enforcement. After the United States cancelled Snowden's passport, stranding him in Russia, they considered transporting him to Latin America on the presidential jet of a sympathetic Latin American leader. In order to throw the US off the scent, they spoke about the jet of the Bolivian president Evo Morales, instead of the jet they were considering. In July 2013, Morales's jet was forced to land in Austria after the US pressured Italy, France, and Spain to deny the jet access to their airspace over false rumours Snowden was on board. Assange said the grounding "reveals the true nature of the relationship between Western Europe and the United States" as "a phone call from U.S. intelligence was enough to close the airspace to a booked presidential flight, which has immunity". Assange advised Snowden that he would be safest in Russia which was better able to protect its borders than Venezuela, Brazil or Ecuador. In 2015, Maria Luisa Ramos, the Bolivian ambassador to Russia, accused Assange of putting Morales' life at risk. Assange stated that he regretted what happened but that "[w]e can't predict that other countries engage in some... unprecedented criminal operation".

Operation Speargun
Documents provided by Edward Snowden showed that in 2012 and 2013 the New Zealand government worked to establish a secret mass surveillance programme which it called "Operation Speargun". On 15 September 2014 while campaigning for Kim Dotcom, Assange appeared via remote video link on his Moment of Truth town hall meeting held in Auckland, which discussed the programme. Assange said the Snowden documents showed that he had been a target of the programme and that "Operation Speargun" represented "an extreme, bizarre, Orwellian future that is being constructed secretly in New Zealand".

Other developments

In 2014, the company hired to monitor Assange warned Ecuador's government that he was "intercepting and gathering information from the embassy and the people who worked there" and that he had compromised the embassy's communications system, which WikiLeaks denied. According to El Pais, a November 2014 UC Global report said that a briefcase with a listening device was found in a room occupied by Assange. The UC Global report said that proved "the suspicion that he is listening in on diplomatic personnel, in this case against the ambassador and the people around him, in an effort to obtain privileged information that could be used to maintain his status in the embassy." According to ambassador Falconí, Assange was evasive when asked about the briefcase.

On 3 July 2015, Paris newspaper Le Monde published an open letter from Assange to French President François Hollande in which Assange urged the French government to grant him refugee status. In response to this letter, Hollande said: "France cannot act on his request. The situation of Mr Assange does not present an immediate danger."

In September 2016 and again on 12 January 2017, WikiLeaks tweeted that if President Obama granted Chelsea Manning clemency, Assange would agree to US extradition. After commuting Manning's sentence on 17 January 2017, Obama stated that Assange's offer had not been a consideration and WikiLeaks tweeted that Assange was "still happy" to agree to extradition if his rights were respected despite Obama's statement. Assange said the decision to grant Manning clemency was an attempt to "make life hard" for Assange and make him look like a liar. One of WikiLeaks' lawyers, Melinda Taylor, said Assange would stand by the offer, and WikiLeaks tweets suggested he was ready for extradition. Assange faced pressure to agree to extradition, but retreated from the offer. WikiLeaks lawyers Melinda Taylor and Barry Pollack said that the clemency didn't meet Assange's conditions and Manning should have been released immediately.

On 19 May 2017, Assange emerged on the embassy's balcony and told a crowd that, despite no longer facing a Swedish sex investigation, he would remain inside the embassy to avoid extradition to the United States.

2016 U.S. presidential election

During the 2016 U.S. presidential campaign, Assange was critical of both Donald Trump and Hillary Clinton. In February 2016, Assange wrote: "Hillary lacks judgment and will push the United States into endless, stupid wars which spread terrorism. ...she certainly should not become president of the United States." In an Election Day statement, Assange said that "The Democratic and Republican candidates have both expressed hostility towards whistleblowers."

On 22 July 2016, WikiLeaks released emails and documents from the Democratic National Committee (DNC), in which the DNC seemingly presented ways of undercutting Clinton's competitor Bernie Sanders and showed apparent favouritism towards Clinton. The release led to the resignation of DNC chairwoman Debbie Wasserman Schultz and an apology to Sanders from the DNC. The New York Times wrote that Assange had timed the release to coincide with the 2016 Democratic National Convention because he believed Clinton had pushed for his indictment and he regarded her as a "liberal war hawk".

On 7 October WikiLeaks began publishing emails from Clinton campaign chairman John Podesta. On 15 October, The Ecuadorian government severed Assange's Internet connection from 15 October until December because of the leaks. 

In November 2017, WikiLeaks asked Donald Trump Jr. to share a WikiLeaks tweet with the quote "Can't we just drone this guy?" which the website True Pundit claimed that Hillary Clinton had made about Assange. After the election, WikiLeaks also requested that the president-elect push Australia to appoint Assange as ambassador to the US.

Cybersecurity experts attributed the attack on the DNC server to the Russian government. and 12 Russian GRU military intelligence agents were later indicted for the attack. According to the Mueller report, this group shared these mails using the pseudonym Guccifer 2.0 with WikiLeaks and other entities. The investigation also unearthed communications between Guccifer 2.0 and  WikiLeaks in which they talked about the release of the material. When asked about Guccifer 2.0's leaks, Assange said "These look very much like they're from the Russians. But in some ways, they look very amateur, and almost look too much like the Russians." The Senate Intelligence Committee reported that "WikiLeaks actively sought, and played, a key role in the Russian intelligence campaign and very likely knew it was assisting a Russian intelligence influence effort."

In interviews, Assange repeatedly said that the Russian government was not the source of the DNC and Podesta emails, and accused the Clinton campaign of "a kind of neo-McCarthy hysteria" about Russian involvement. On the eve of the election, Assange addressed the criticism he had received for publishing Clinton material, saying that WikiLeaks publishes "material given to us if it is of political, diplomatic, historical or ethical importance and which has not been published elsewhere," that it had never received any original information on Trump, Jill Stein, or Gary Johnson's campaign.

Seth Rich

In a July 2016 interview on Dutch television, Assange hinted that DNC staffer Seth Rich was the source of the DNC emails and that Rich had been killed as a result. Seeking clarification, the interviewer asked Assange whether Rich's killing was "simply a murder," to which Assange answered, "No. There's no finding. So, I'm suggesting that our sources take risks, and they become concerned to see things occurring like that." WikiLeaks offered a $20,000 reward for information about his murder and wrote: "We treat threats toward any suspected source of WikiLeaks with extreme gravity. This should not be taken to imply that Seth Rich was a source to WikiLeaks or to imply that his murder is connected to our publications."

Assange's comments set off a spike in attention to the murder. Assange's statements lent credibility and visibility to what had at that point been a conspiracy theory in the fringe parts of the Internet. According to the Mueller investigation, Assange "implied falsely" that Rich was the source ostensibly to obscure the fact that Russian military intelligence was the source, and Assange received the emails when Rich was already dead and continued to confer with the Russian hackers to coordinate the release of the material.

Later years in the embassy

In March 2017, WikiLeaks began releasing the largest leak of CIA documents in history, codenamed Vault 7. The documents included details of the CIA's hacking capabilities and software tools used to break into smartphones, computers and other Internet-connected devices. In April, CIA director Mike Pompeo called WikiLeaks "a non-state hostile intelligence service often abetted by state actors like Russia". Assange responded "For the head of the CIA to pronounce what the boundaries are, of reporting or not reporting — is a very disturbing precedent. The head of the CIA determining who is a publisher, who's not a publisher, who's a journalist, who's not a journalist, is totally out of line". According to former intelligence officials, in the wake of the Vault7 leaks, the CIA talked about kidnapping Assange from Ecuador's London embassy, and some senior officials discussed his potential assassination. Yahoo! News found "no indication that the most extreme measures targeting Assange were ever approved." Some of its sources said that they had alerted House and Senate intelligence committees to the plans that Pompeo and others was suggesting. In October 2021, Assange's lawyers introduced the alleged plot during a hearing of the High Court of Justice in London as it considered the U.S. appeal of a lower court's ruling that Assange could not be extradited to face charges in the U.S. In 2022 the Spanish courts summoned Pompeo as a witness to testify on the alleged plans.

On 6 June 2017, Assange supported NSA leaker Reality Winner, who had been arrested three days earlier, by tweeting "Acts of non-elite sources communicating knowledge should be strongly encouraged".

On 16 August 2017, US Republican congressman Dana Rohrabacher visited Assange and told him that Trump would pardon him on condition that he would agree to say that Russia was not involved in the 2016 Democratic National Committee email leaks. At his extradition hearings in 2020, Assange's defence team alleged in court that this offer was made "on instructions from the president". Trump and Rohrabacher subsequently said they had never spoken about the offer and Rohrabacher said he had made the offer on his own initiative.

In August 2017, in the midst of the Qatar diplomatic crisis, Dubai-based Al Arabiya said Assange had refrained from publishing two cables about Qatar after negotiations between WikiLeaks and Qatar. Assange said Al Arabiya had been publishing "increasingly absurd fabrications" during the dispute.

Ecuador granted Assange citizenship in December 2017, and on the 19th approved a "special designation in favor of Mr. Julian Assange so that he can carry out functions at the Ecuadorean Embassy in Russia." On the 21st, Britain's Foreign Office wrote that it did not recognise Assange as a diplomat, and that he did not have "any type of privileges and immunities under the Vienna Convention." The citizenship was later revoked over unpaid fees and problems in the naturalisation papers, which allegedly had multiple inconsistencies, different signatures, and the possible alteration of documents. Assange's lawyer said the decision had been made without due process, but Ecuador's Foreign Ministry said the Pichincha Court for Contentious Administrative Matters had "acted independently and followed due process in a case that took place during the previous government and that was raised by the same previous government."

In January 2018, Sean Hannity's Twitter account was temporarily deleted and Assange sent an account impersonating the Fox News host messages offering "news" on Mark Warner, a senior Democrat senator investigating Trump-Russia links. Assange asked the fake Hannity to contact him about it on "other channels".

In February 2018, after Sweden had suspended its investigation, Assange brought two legal actions, arguing that Britain should drop its arrest warrant for him as it was "no longer right or proportionate to pursue him" and the arrest warrant for breaching bail had lost its "purpose and its function". In both cases, Senior District Judge Emma Arbuthnot ruled that the arrest warrant should remain in place.

In March 2018, Assange used social media to criticise Germany's arrest of Catalonian separatist leader Carles Puigdemont. He also tweeted that Britain was about to conduct a propaganda war against Russia relating to the Poisoning of Sergei and Yulia Skripal. On 28 March 2018, Ecuador responded by cutting Assange's internet connection. Ecuador said he had broken a commitment "not to issue messages that might interfere with other states" and Assange said he was "exercising his right to free speech". In May 2018, The Guardian reported that over five years Ecuador had spent at least $5million (£3.7m) to protect Assange, employing a security company and undercover agents to monitor his visitors, embassy staff and the British police. Ecuador reportedly devised plans to help Assange escape should British police forcibly enter the embassy to seize him. The Guardian reported that by 2014 Assange had compromised the embassy's communications system. WikiLeaks described the allegation as "an anonymous libel aligned with the current UK-US government onslaught against Mr Assange". In July 2018, President Moreno said that he was talking to the British government about how to end Assange's asylum and guarantee his life would be safe.

On 16 October 2018, members of Congress from the United States House Committee on Foreign Affairs wrote an open letter to President Moreno, which described Assange as a dangerous criminal. It stated that progress between the US and Ecuador in economic cooperation, counter-narcotics assistance, and the return of a USAID mission to Ecuador depended on Assange being handed over to the authorities.

On 11 October 2018, Ecuador laid out stringent rules for Assange and partially restored his communications. According to the new restrictions, Assange could only use the embassy wifi for his personal computer and phone. It also said that the embassy had "the right to authorise security personnel to seize equipment" or ask British authorities to do so. The new rules prohibited "unauthorised equipment" and said they would be considered a "security breach and reported to the competent British authorities". Assange was also told to provide for the "well-being, food, hygiene and proper care" of his cat, keep his bathroom clean and pay his own costs after 1 December 2018. He would also be required to have and pay for quarterly medical care.

On 19 October 2018, Assange sued the government of Ecuador for violating his "fundamental rights and freedoms" by threatening to remove his protection and cut off his access to the outside world, refusing him visits from journalists and human rights organisations and installing signal jammers to prevent phone calls and internet access. An Ecuadorian judge ruled against him, saying that requiring Assange to pay for his Internet use and clean up after his cat did not violate his right to asylum.

In November 2018, Pamela Anderson, a close friend and regular visitor of Assange, gave an interview in which she asked the Australian prime minister, Scott Morrison, to defend Assange. Morrison rejected the request with a response Anderson considered "smutty". Anderson responded that "[r]ather than making lewd suggestions about me, perhaps you should instead think about what you are going to say to millions of Australians when one of their own is marched in an orange jumpsuit to Guantanamo Bay – for publishing the truth. You can prevent this."

On 21 December 2018, the UN's Working Group on Arbitrary Detention urged the UK to let Assange leave the embassy freely. In February 2019, the parliament of Geneva passed a motion demanding that the Swiss government extend asylum to Assange. In January 2020, the Catalan Dignity Commission awarded Assange its 2019 Dignity Prize for supporting the Catalan people during the 2017 Catalan independence referendum. In March 2019, Assange submitted a complaint to the Inter-American Commission on Human Rights asking the Ecuadorian government to "ease the conditions that it had imposed on his residence" at the embassy and to protect him from extradition to the US. It also requested US prosecutors unseal criminal charges that had been filed against him. Assange said the Ecuadorian embassy was trying to end his asylum by spying on him and restricting his visitors. The commission rejected his complaint.

Surveillance of Assange in the embassy

On 10 April 2019, WikiLeaks said it had uncovered an extensive surveillance operation against Assange from within the embassy. WikiLeaks said that "material including video, audio, copies of private legal documents and a medical report" had surfaced in Spain and that unnamed individuals in Madrid had made an extortion attempt.

On 26 September 2019, the Spanish newspaper El País reported that the Spanish defence and security company Undercover Global S.L. (UC Global) had spied on Assange for the CIA during his time in the embassy. UC Global had been contracted to protect the embassy during this time. According to the report UC Global's owner David Morales had provided the CIA with audio and video of meetings Assange held with his lawyers and colleagues. Morales also arranged for the US to have direct access to the stream from video cameras installed in the embassy at the beginning of December 2017. The evidence was part of a secret investigation by Spain's High Court, the Audiencia Nacional, into Morales and his relationship with US intelligence. The investigation was precipitated by a complaint by Assange that accused UC Global of violating his privacy and client-attorney privileges as well as committing misappropriation, bribery and money laundering. Morales was arrested in September on charges involving violations of privacy and client-attorney privileges, as well as misappropriation, bribery, money laundering and criminal possession of weapons. He was released on bail.

On 25 September Spanish Judge José de la Mata sent British authorities a European Investigation Order (EIO) asking for permission to question Assange by videoconference as a witness in the case against Morales. The United Kingdom Central Authority (UKCA), which is in charge of processing and responding to EIOs in the UK, provisionally denied De la Mata's request to question Assange, raised a number of objections to the request, and asked for more details. De la Mata responded to UKCA's objections on 14 October by stating that Assange was the victim who had filed the complaint and that unlawful disclosure of secrets and bribery are also crimes in the UK. He said that the crimes were partially committed on Spanish territory because the microphones used to spy on Assange were bought in Spain, and the information obtained was sent and uploaded to servers at UC Global S. L.'s headquarters in Spain.

Spanish judicial bodies were upset at having their EIO request denied by UKCA and believed the British justice system was concerned by the effect the Spanish case may have on the process to extradite Assange to the US.

In a November 2019 article, Stefania Maurizi said she had access to some of the videos, audios and photos showing a medical examination of Assange, a meeting between Ecuadorian ambassador Carlos Abad Ortiz and his staff, a meeting between Assange, Glenn Greenwald and David Miranda and lunch between Assange and British rapper M.I.A. According to Maurizi, microphones had been placed in the women's toilets to capture meetings between Assange and his lawyers and phones belonging to some of the embassy's visitors were compromised. Spanish lawyer Aitor Martinez, who is part of Assange's legal team, said videos were taken of meetings between Assange and his legal defence team. Maurizi wrote that, based on statements from former employees of UC Global, internal UC Global emails and the type of information collected, she believed the surveillance was conducted on behalf of the US government and could be used in support of the extradition case.

Britain agreed to allow Judge De la Mata to interview Assange via video link on 20 December. According to his lawyer, Assange testified that he was unaware that cameras installed by Undercover Global were also capturing audio and suggested the surveillance likely targeted his legal team. In August 2022, four of Assange's American lawyers and journalists filed a lawsuit against the CIA, Mike Pompeo, UC Global, and Morales over the surveillance.

Imprisonment and extradition proceedings

Arrest in the embassy

On 2 April 2019, Ecuador's president Moreno said that Assange had violated the terms of his asylum, after photos surfaced on the internet linking Moreno to a corruption scandal. WikiLeaks said it merely reported on a corruption investigation against Moreno by Ecuador's legislature. WikiLeaks reported a source within the Ecuadorian government saying that, due to the controversy, an agreement had been reached to expel Assange from the embassy and place him in the custody of UK police. According to Assange's father, the revoking of Assange's asylum was connected to an upcoming decision by the International Monetary Fund to grant Ecuador a loan, an assertion also made by critics of Moreno, such as former Ecuadorian foreign minister Guillaume Long.

On 11 April 2019 the Ecuadorian government invited the Metropolitan Police into the embassy, and they arrested Assange on charges that he skipped bail in the UK in 2012 and on the basis of a US extradition warrant. Foreign Minister José Valencia said an audio recording captured Assange threatening Ambassador Jaime Merchan with a panic button that he said would bring devastating consequences for the Embassy in the event of his arrest. Ecuador's authorities shared the threat with British authorities and when arresting Assange they were careful to not let him trigger any possible emergency plans.

Moreno accused Assange of installing electronic distortion equipment in the embassy, blocking security cameras, mistreating guards and accessing security files without permission and stated that Ecuador withdrew Assange's asylum after he interfered in Ecuador's domestic affairs, adding that "the patience of Ecuador has reached its limit on the behaviour of Mr. Assange". Foreign minister José Valencia listed nine reasons why Assange's asylum was withdrawn, and said Ecuador had no choice after Assange's "innumerable acts of interference in the politics of other states."

Conviction for breach of bail
On the day of his arrest, Assange was charged with breaching the Bail Act 1976 and was found guilty after a short hearing. Assange's defence said chief magistrate Emma Arbuthnot, who had dealt with his case, was biased against him as her husband was directly affected by WikiLeaks' allegations. According to an article by Mark Curtis and Matt Kennard in the Daily Maverick, Emma Arbuthnot's husband, James Arbuthnot, "has financial links to the British military establishment, including institutions and individuals exposed by WikiLeaks". The Intercept reported that Emma Arbuthnot's husband and son had "links to people cited for criminal activities in documents published by WikiLeaks" and that her family had "additional connections to the intelligence services and defense industries". Judge Michael Snow said it was "unacceptable" to air the claim in front of a "packed press gallery" and that Assange's "assertion that he has not had a fair hearing is laughable. And his behaviour is that of a narcissist who cannot get beyond his own selfish interests." Judge Snow also said "He has chosen not to give evidence, he has chosen to make assertions about a senior judge not having the courage to place himself before the court for the purpose of cross-examination. Those assertions made through counsel are not evidence as a matter of law. I find they are not capable of amounting to a reasonable excuse."

Assange was remanded to Belmarsh Prison, and on 1 May 2019 was sentenced to 50 weeks imprisonment. The judge said he would be released after serving half of his sentence, subject to other proceedings and conditional upon committing no further offences. The United Nations Working Group on Arbitrary Detention said that the verdict contravened "principles of necessity and proportionality" for what it considered a "minor violation". Assange appealed his sentence, but dropped his appeal in July.

Espionage indictment in the United States

In 2012 and 2013, US officials indicated that Assange was not named in a sealed indictment. On 6 March 2018, a federal grand jury for the Eastern District of Virginia issued a sealed indictment against Assange. In November 2018, US prosecutors accidentally revealed the indictment.

In February 2019, Chelsea Manning was subpoenaed to appear before a grand jury in Virginia in the case. When Manning condemned the secrecy of the hearings and refused to testify, she was jailed for contempt of court on 8 March 2019. On 11 April 2019, the day of Assange's arrest in London, the indictment against him was unsealed. He was charged with conspiracy to commit computer intrusion (i.e., hacking into a government computer), which carries a maximum five-year sentence. The charges stem from the allegation that Assange attempted and failed to crack a password hash so that Chelsea Manning could use a different username to download classified documents and avoid detection. This allegation had been known since 2011 and was a factor in Manning's trial; the indictment did not reveal any new information about Assange.

On 23 May 2019, Assange was indicted on 17 new charges relating to the Espionage Act of 1917 in the United States District Court for the Eastern District of Virginia. The charges carried a maximum sentence of 170 years in prison:
Conspiracy to obtain and disclose national defence information;
Conspiracy to commit computer intrusions;
Obtaining national defence information (seven counts); and
Disclosure of national defence information (nine counts).
The US Department of Justice stated that the new indictment "broaden[s] the scope of... alleged computer intrusions", alleging that Assange recruited and agreed with hackers, encouraging them to hack to get information for WikiLeaks. Assange allegedly told the Hacking At Random conference that WikiLeaks got private documents from the Congressional Research Service by exploiting "a small vulnerability" inside the United States Congress, and then told them "[t]his is what any one of you would find if you were actually looking." The indictment also alleged he "communicated directly with a leader of the hacking group LulzSec [,]... provided a list of targets for LulzSec to hack".

In a call with reporters, U.S. Attorney Terwilliger said that "Assange is charged for his alleged complicity in illegal acts to obtain or receive voluminous databases of classified information and for agreeing and attempting to obtain classified information through computer hacking. The United States has not charged Assange for passively obtaining or receiving classified information."

Most cases brought under the Espionage Act have been against government employees who accessed sensitive information and leaked it to journalists and others. Prosecuting people for acts related to receiving and publishing information has not previously been tested in court. Gabe Rottman from the Reporters Committee for Freedom of the Press, said there were a few occasions when the U.S. government had almost charged a journalist under the Espionage Act, but had decided not to proceed. He mentioned the case of Seymour Hersh, whom the Justice Department decided after consideration not to charge for reporting on US surveillance of the Soviet Union. Buzzfeed News wrote that lawyers to whom it had spoken said there was only previous case in which third parties were prosecuted for sharing leaked information. In that case, two lobbyists for a pro-Israel group were charged in 2005 with receiving and sharing classified information about American policy toward Iran. The charges, however, did not relate to the publication of the documents and the case was dropped in 2009.

The Obama administration had debated charging Assange under the Espionage Act, but decided against it out of fear that it would have a negative effect on investigative journalism and could be unconstitutional. The New York Times commented that it and other news organisations obtained the same documents as WikiLeaks also without government authorisation. It said it was not clear how WikiLeaks' publications were legally different from other publications of classified information.

The Associated Press reported that the indictment raised concerns about media freedom, as Assange's solicitation and publication of classified information is a routine job journalists perform. Steve Vladeck, a professor at the University of Texas School of Law, stated that what Assange is accused of doing is factually different from but legally similar to what professional journalists do. Suzanne Nossel of PEN America said it was immaterial if Assange was a journalist or publisher and pointed instead to First Amendment concerns.

While some American journalism institutions and politicians supported Assange's arrest and indictment, several non-government organisations for press freedom condemned it. Mark Warner, vice-chairman of the United States Senate Select Committee on Intelligence, said that Assange was "a dedicated accomplice in efforts to undermine American security". After Assange's arrest and first indictment, the New York Times' Editorial Board wrote that "The case of Mr. Assange, who got his start as a computer hacker, illuminates the conflict of freedom and harm in the new technologies, and could help draw a sharp line between legitimate journalism and dangerous cybercrime." The editorial board also warned that "The administration has begun well by charging Mr. Assange with an indisputable crime. But there is always a risk with this administration — one that labels the free press as "the enemy of the people" — that the prosecution of Mr. Assange could become an assault on the First Amendment and whistle-blowers." The Washington Post's Editorial Board wrote that Assange was "not a free-press hero" or a journalist, and that he was "long overdue for personal accountability."

Several jurists, politicians, associations, academics and campaigners viewed the arrest of Assange as an attack on freedom of the press and international law. Reporters Without Borders said Assange's arrest would "set a dangerous precedent for journalists, whistle-blowers, and other journalistic sources that the US may wish to pursue in the future". Kenneth Roth, executive director of Human Rights Watch, wrote that Assange's prosecution for publishing leaked documents is "a major threat to global media freedom". United Nations human rights expert Agnes Callamard said the indictment exposed him to the risk of serious human rights violations. Ben Wizner from the American Civil Liberties Union said that prosecuting Assange "for violating US secrecy laws would set an especially dangerous precedent for US journalists, who routinely violate foreign secrecy laws to deliver information vital to the public's interest".

Imprisonment in the UK

Since his arrest on 11 April 2019, Assange has been incarcerated in HM Prison Belmarsh in London.

After examining Assange on 9 May 2019, Nils Melzer, the United Nations special rapporteur on Torture and Other Cruel, Inhuman or Degrading Treatment or Punishment, concluded that "in addition to physical ailments, Mr Assange showed all symptoms typical for prolonged exposure to psychological torture, including extreme stress, chronic anxiety and intense psychological trauma." The British government said it disagreed with some of his observations.

On 13 September 2019, District Judge Vanessa Baraitser ruled that Assange would not be released on 22 September when his prison term ended because he was a flight risk and his lawyer had not applied for bail. She said when his sentence came to an end, his status would change from a serving prisoner to a person facing extradition.

On 1 November 2019, Melzer said that Assange's health had continued to deteriorate and his life was now at risk. He said that the UK government had not acted on the issue. On 30 December 2019, Melzer accused the UK government of torturing Assange. He said Assange's "continued exposure to severe mental and emotional suffering... clearly amounts to psychological torture or other cruel, inhuman or degrading treatment or punishment."

On 17 February 2020, Australian MPs Andrew Wilkie and George Christensen visited Assange and pressed the UK and Australian governments to intervene to stop his being extradited.

On 25 March 2020, Assange was denied bail after Judge Baraitser rejected his lawyers' argument that his imprisonment would put him at high risk of contracting COVID-19. She said Assange's past conduct showed how far he was willing to go to avoid extradition. In September 2020, an open letter in support of Assange was sent to Boris Johnson with the signatures of the Presidents of Argentina and Venezuela and approximately 160 other politicians. The following month, U.S. Representatives Tulsi Gabbard and Thomas Massie introduced a bipartisan resolution opposing the extradition of Assange. In December 2020, German human rights commissioner Bärbel Kofler cautioned the UK about the need to consider Assange's physical and mental health before deciding whether to extradite him.

Hearings on extradition to the US

On 2 May 2019, the first hearing was held in London into the U.S. request for Assange's extradition. When asked by Judge Snow whether he consented to extradition, Assange replied, "I do not wish to surrender myself for extradition for doing journalism that has won many, many awards and protected many people". On 13 June, British Home Secretary Sajid Javid said he had signed the extradition order.

Towards the end of 2019, Judge Emma Arbuthnot, who had presided at several of the extradition hearings, stepped aside because of "judicial guidance that advises on avoiding the perception of bias" when her family's connections to the intelligence services and defence industries became public. Vanessa Baraitser was appointed as the presiding judge.

On 21 October 2019, Assange appeared for a case management hearing at the court. When Judge Baraitser asked about his understanding of the proceedings, Assange replied:

In February 2020, the court heard legal arguments. Assange's lawyers contended that he had been charged with political offences and therefore could not be extradited. The hearings were delayed for months due to requests for extra time from the prosecution and the defence and due to the COVID-19 pandemic. In March, the International Bar Association's Human Rights Institute, IBAHRI, condemned the mistreatment of Assange in the extradition trial.

Assange appeared in court on 7 September 2020, facing the espionage indictment with 18 counts. Judge Baraitser denied motions by Assange's barristers to dismiss the new charges or to adjourn to better respond.

Some witnesses who testified in September, such as Daniel Ellsberg, did so remotely via video link due to COVID-19 restrictions. Technical problems caused extensive delays. Torture victim Khaled el-Masri, who was originally requested as a defence witness, had his testimony reduced to a written statement. Other witnesses testified that the conditions of imprisonment, which would be likely to worsen upon extradition to the U.S., placed Assange at a high risk of depression and suicide which was exacerbated by his Asperger syndrome. During the court proceedings the defence drew attention to a prison service report stating that a hidden razor blade had been found by a prison officer during a search of Assange's cell. During the proceedings it was also revealed that Assange had contacted the Samaritans phone service on numerous occasions.

Patrick Eller, a former forensics examiner with the U.S. Army Criminal Investigation Command, testified that Assange did not crack and could not have cracked the password mentioned in the U.S. indictment, as Chelsea Manning had intentionally sent only a portion of the password's hash. Moreover, Eller stated that password cracking was a common topic of discussion among other soldiers stationed at Forward Operating Base Hammer, suggesting that Manning's message was unrelated to the classified documents which were already in her possession. Testimony on 30 September revealed new allegations surrounding the surveillance of the Ecuadorian embassy by UC Global. A former UC Global employee, who spoke anonymously, fearing reprisals, stated that the firm undertook "an increasingly sophisticated operation" after it was put into contact with the Trump administration by Sheldon Adelson. According to the employee, intelligence agents discussed plans to break into the embassy to kidnap or poison Assange and attempted to obtain the DNA of a baby who was believed to be Assange's child.

Hearings, including a statement in support of the defence by Noam Chomsky, concluded on 1 October 2020.

On 4 January 2021, Judge Baraitser ruled that Assange could not be extradited to the United States, citing concerns about his mental health and the risk of suicide in a US prison. She sided with the US on every other point, including whether the charges constituted political offences and whether he was entitled to freedom of speech protections.

Appeals and other developments 
On 6 January 2021, Assange was denied bail on the grounds that he was a flight risk, pending an appeal by the United States. The US prosecutors appealed against the denial of extradition on 15 January.

Following the decision by Judge Baraitser that it would be "oppressive to extradite [Assange] to the United States," in July 2021 the Biden administration assured the Crown Prosecution Services that "Mr Assange will not be subject to SAMs or imprisoned at ADX (unless he were to do something subsequent to the offering of these assurances that meets the tests for the imposition of SAMs or designation to ADX)". The United States also assured that it "will consent to Mr Assange being transferred to Australia to serve any custodial sentence imposed on him." An Amnesty International expert on national security and human rights in Europe said, "Those are not assurances at all. It's not that difficult to look at those assurances and say: these are inherently unreliable, it promises to do something and then reserves the right to break the promise".

In June 2021 Icelandic newspaper Stundin published details of an interview with Sigurdur Ingi Thordarson, the witness identified as "Teenager" in the U.S. Justice Department's case against Assange. In the interview Thordarson, who had received a promise of immunity from prosecution in return for co-operating with the FBI, stated he had fabricated allegations used in the U.S. indictment. The Washington Post said Thordarson's testimony was not used as the basis for charges but for information on Assange's contact with Chelsea Manning. A year previously The Washington Post said the superceding indictment broadened the case against Assange to that he was a hacker not a publisher and gave evidence for that from Thordarson.

Ecuador revoked Assange's citizenship in July 2021.

In August 2021 in the High Court, Lord Justice Holroyde ruled that Judge Baraitser may have given too much weight to what Holroyde called "a misleading report" by an expert witness for the defence, psychiatrist Prof Michael Kopelman, and granted permission for the contested risk of suicide to be raised on the appeal.

In October 2021, the High Court held a two-day appeal hearing presided over by Ian Burnett, Baron Burnett of Maldon, Lord Chief Justice of England and Wales, and Lord Justice Holroyde. In opening the U.S. as appellant argued that Assange's health issues were less severe than claimed during the initial extradition hearing and that his depression was moderate rather than severe. They also drew attention to binding assurances given by the U.S. concerning his proposed treatment in custody. In response, Edward Fitzgerald QC drew attention to a Yahoo! News report that the CIA had plotted to poison, abduct or assassinate Assange. Fitzgerald argued: "Given the revelations of surveillance in the embassy and plots to kill [Assange]," "there are great grounds for fearing what will be done to him" if extradited to the U.S. He urged the court "not to trust [the] assurances" of the "same government" alleged to have plotted Assange's killing. His partner Stella Moris, told reporters Assange suffered a mini-stroke on 27 October while sitting through the court hearing and was subsequently given anti-stroke medication.

On 10 December 2021, the High Court ruled in favour of the United States. The Lord Chief Justice and Lord Justice Holroyde ruled that, in line with previous judgements, when the US administration gives a promise of fair and humane treatment its word should not be doubted. The case was remitted to Westminster Magistrates' Court with the direction that it be sent to the Home Secretary Priti Patel for the final decision on whether to extradite Assange. On 24 January 2022 Assange was granted permission to petition the Supreme Court of the United Kingdom for an appeal hearing, but in March the court refused to allow the appeal, saying that Assange had not raised an arguable point of law.

In an auction of non-fungible tokens on 9 February 2022 organised by Pak collaborating with Assange, an NFT artwork called "Clock" by him was bought by a decentralised autonomous organisation, ("DAO") of over 10,000 supporters called AssangeDAO and raised 16,593 of the cryptocurrency ether, worth about $52.8m at the time, for Assange's legal defence. "Clock" updates each day to show how long Assange has been imprisoned.

On 20 April 2022, Chief Magistrate Paul Goldspring of the Westminster Magistrates Court formally approved the extradition of Assange to the US and referred the decision to the Home Secretary Priti Patel. On 17 June 2022, Patel approved the extradition.

The incoming Australian Labor government of Anthony Albanese indicated that it would oppose the continued prosecution of Assange but would pursue quiet diplomacy to achieve this aim.

On 1 July 2022, Assange lodged an appeal against the extradition in the High Court. On 22 August 2022, Assange's legal team lodged a Perfected Grounds of Appeal before the High Court challenging District Judge Vanessa Baraitser's decision of 4 January 2021 with new evidence. Assange also made a further appeal to the European Court of Human Rights, but on 13 December 2022, this appeal was declared inadmissible.

Writings, talk show, and opinions

In 2012 Assange hosted World Tomorrow show, broadcast by Russian network RT. He has written a few short pieces, including "State and terrorist conspiracies" (2006), "Conspiracy as governance" (2006), "The hidden curse of Thomas Paine" (2008), "What's new about WikiLeaks?" (2011), and the foreword to Cypherpunks (2012). Cypherpunks is primarily a transcript of World Tomorrow episode eight, a two-part interview between Assange, Jacob Appelbaum, Andy Müller-Maguhn, and Jérémie Zimmermann. In the foreword, Assange said, "the Internet, our greatest tool for emancipation, has been transformed into the most dangerous facilitator of totalitarianism we have ever seen". He also contributed research to Suelette Dreyfus's Underground (1997), and received a co-writer credit for the Calle 13 song "Multi Viral" (2013). In 2010, Assange said he was a libertarian and that "WikiLeaks is designed to make capitalism more free and ethical".

In 2010, Assange received a deal for his autobiography worth at least US$1.3million. In 2011, Canongate Books published Julian Assange, The Unauthorised Autobiography. Assange immediately disavowed it, stating, "I am not 'the writer' of this book. I own the copyright of the manuscript, which was written by Andrew O'Hagan." Assange accused Canongate of breaching their contract by publishing, against his wishes, a draft that Assange considered "a work in progress" and "entirely uncorrected or fact-checked by me." In 2014, O'Hagan wrote about his experience as Assange's ghostwriter. "The story of his life mortified him and sent him scurrying for excuses," O'Hagan recalled. "He didn't want to do the book. He hadn't from the beginning." Colin Robinson, co-publisher of Assange's 2012 book Cypherpunks, criticised O'Hagan for largely ignoring the bigger issues about which Assange had been warning, and noted that O'Hagan's piece "is no part of an organised dirty tricks campaign. But by focusing as it does on Assange's character defects, it ends up serving much the same purpose."

Assange's book When Google Met WikiLeaks was published by OR Books in 2014. It recounts when Google CEO Eric Schmidt requested a meeting with Assange, while he was on bail in rural Norfolk, UK. Schmidt was accompanied by Jared Cohen, director of Google Ideas; Lisa Shields, vice-president of the Council on Foreign Relations; and Scott Malcomson, the communications director for the International Crisis Group. Excerpts were published on the Newsweek website, while Assange participated in a Q&A event that was facilitated by the Reddit website and agreed to an interview with Vogue magazine.

In 2011, an article in Private Eye by its editor, Ian Hislop, recounted a rambling phone call he had received from Assange, who was especially angry about Private Eye′s report that Israel Shamir, an Assange associate in Russia, was a Holocaust denier. Assange suggested, Hislop wrote, "that British journalists, including the editor of The Guardian, were engaged in a Jewish-led conspiracy to smear his organization." Assange subsequently responded that Hislop had "distorted, invented or misremembered almost every significant claim and phrase." He added, "We treasure our strong Jewish support and staff, just as we treasure the support from pan-Arab democracy activists and others who share our hope for a just world."

Personal life

While still a teenager, Assange married a woman, also in her teens, named Teresa, and in 1989 they had a son named Daniel. The couple separated and disputed custody of Daniel until 1999. According to Assange's mother, his brown hair turned white during the time of the custody dispute.

Daniel Domscheit-Berg said in his 2011 memoir Inside WikiLeaks: My Time with Julian Assange at the World's Most Dangerous Website that Assange said he had fathered several children. In an email in January 2007, Assange mentioned having a daughter. In 2015, in an open letter to French President Hollande, Assange revealed he had another child. He said that this, his youngest child, was French, as was the child's mother. He also said his family had faced death threats and harassment because of his work, forcing them to change identities and reduce contact with him.

In 2015, Assange began a relationship with Stella Moris, his South African-born lawyer. They were engaged in 2017 and have two sons, born in 2017 and 2019. Moris revealed their relationship in 2020 because she feared for Assange's life. On 7 November 2021, the couple said they were preparing legal action against Deputy UK Prime Minister Dominic Raab and Jenny Louis, governor of Belmarsh Prison. Assange and Moris accused Raab and Louis of denying their and their two children's human rights by blocking and delaying their marriage. On 11 November, the prison service said it had granted permission for the couple to marry in Belmarsh Prison, and on 23 March 2022 the couple married.

Assessments

Views on Assange have been given by a number of public figures, including journalists, well-known whistleblowers, activists and world leaders. They range from laudatory statements to calls for his execution.

2010
In 2010, Pentagon Papers whistleblower Daniel Ellsberg said that Assange was a kindred spirit who disclosed information "on a scale that might really make a difference" and "has shown much better judgment with respect to what he has revealed than the people who kept those items secret inside the government." During an argument in an internal chat, Domscheit-Berg told Assange he was failing as a leader. After Assange told him he should quit, former WikiLeaks member Herbert Snorrason questioned his judgment. Other departing members who challenged his leadership style included Birgitta Jonsdottir, who acknowledged his importance to the organisation. In November 2010, an individual from the office of the President of Russia, suggested that Assange should be awarded the Nobel Peace Prize.

In December 2010, Luiz Inácio Lula da Silva who was then the President of Brazil, said "They have arrested him and I don't hear so much as a single protest for freedom of expression". Vladimir Putin, the prime minister of Russia, asked at a press conference "Why is Mr. Assange in prison? Is this democracy?" In the same month Julia Gillard, Prime Minister of Australia, described his activities as "illegal" but the Australian Federal Police said he had not broken Australian law. Joe Biden, the vice-president of the United States, was asked whether he saw Assange as closer to a high-tech terrorist than to whistleblower Ellsberg. Biden responded that he "would argue it is closer to being a high-tech terrorist than the Pentagon Papers". Former WikiLeaks member John Young said Assange wanted to go to jail or have a show trial as a way to become more famous. Young was later a witness for Assange's defence at his extradition hearing in 2020, and in 2022 publicly asked the US Justice Department to indict Young himself, for publishing the same leaks involved in Assange's case before Wikileaks did so.

American politicians Mitch McConnell, Newt Gingrich, and Sarah Palin each either referred to Assange as "a high-tech terrorist" or suggested that through publishing US diplomatic traffic he was engaged in terrorism. Other American and Canadian politicians and media personalities including Tom Flanagan, and Mike Huckabee called for his assassination or execution.

Journalists at The Guardian, The Daily Beast, and Salon wrote that Assange wasn't a journalist, and other journalists at Salon argued he was. Italian Rolling Stone magazine called Assange "the person who best embodied a rock'n'roll behaviour" during 2010, describing him a cross between a James Bond villain, a Marvel superhero and a character from The Matrix films. It hailed him as "the exterminator of secrets held by the world's great powers".

2011–2014
In his 2011 memoir Inside WikiLeaks: My Time with Julian Assange at the World's Most Dangerous Website, Domscheit-Berg criticised Assange's character, his attitude towards women, and his handling of the "Collateral Murder" video clip. He wrote that Assange had lied to The New Yorker about decrypting the video clip, and had refused to reimburse WikiLeaks' staffers who worked on the project. Domscheit-Berg described Assange as "freethinking", "energetic" and "brilliant" as well as "paranoid", "power-obsessed" and "monomaniacal". In March 2011, Australian author Robert Manne wrote that Assange was "one of the best-known and most-respected human beings on earth". In September 2011, the Guardian, New York Times, El Pais, Der Spiegel, and Le Monde made a joint statement that they condemned and deplored the decision by Julian Assange to publish the unredacted state department cables and WikiLeaks insiders including Birgita criticised Assange's handling of the moral issue of the Afghan War Diary and "dictatorial tendencies" inside WikiLeaks.

In November 2011 Vaughan Smith, founder of the Frontline Club, said he supported Assange "in terms of the manner in which he is delivering us an opportunity to talk about really important stuff. I think it's important that we are encouraged to discuss secrecy in our society. It's good for us". In July 2012, Smith offered his residence in Norfolk for Assange to continue WikiLeaks' operations whilst in the UK. Smith told the press it was not about whether Assange was right or wrong for what he had done with WikiLeaks, it was about "standing up to the bully" and "whether our country, in these historic times, really was the tolerant, independent, and open place I had been brought up to believe it was and feel that it needs to be".

In April 2012, interviewed on Assange's television show World Tomorrow, Ecuadorian president Rafael Correa praised WikiLeaks and told his host "Cheer up! Cheer up! Welcome to the club of the persecuted!" That October, Andy Greenberg said The Architect "sees Assange as driven by his ego and there were points when he felt like Assange was not as focused about the release of significant information as he was on breaking records, releasing leaks that were bigger than the last one."

In 2012, Bob Beckel called for Assange's assassination, and in 2013, Michael Grunwald echoed the call, though Grunwald later apologised for this, saying, "It was a dumb tweet. I'm sorry. I deserve the backlash". In April 2013, filmmaker Oliver Stone stated that "Julian Assange did much for free speech and is now being victimised by the abusers of that concept." In 2013, Jemima Khan wrote that when dealing with Assange, "pundits on both the left and the right have become more interested in tribalism than truth. The attacks on him by his many critics in the press have been virulent and highly personal." Vivienne Westwood criticised Khan for ending her support for Assange. Khan wrote:"As editor-in-chief of WikiLeaks, Assange had created a transparency mechanism to hold governments and corporations to account. I abhor lies and WikiLeaks exposed the most dangerous lies of all – those told to us by our elected governments. WikiLeaks exposed corruption, war crimes, torture and cover-ups. ... If Assange is prosecuted in the US for espionage, I suspect even his most disenchanted former supporters will take to the barricades in his defence. The list of alienated and disaffected allies is long: some say they fell out over redactions, some over broken deals, some over money, some over ownership and control. The roll-call includes Assange's earliest WikiLeaks collaborators, Daniel Domscheit-Berg and "The Architect", the anonymous technical whizz behind much of the WikiLeaks platform. It also features the journalists with whom he worked on the leaked cables: Nick Davies, David Leigh, and Luke Harding of the Guardian; the New York Times team; James Ball; and the Freedom of Information campaigner Heather Brooke. Assange's former lawyer Mark Stephens; Jamie Byng of Canongate Books, who paid him a reported £500,000 advance for a ghostwritten autobiography for which Assange withdrew his co-operation before publication; the Channel 4 team which made a documentary about him which resulted in his unsuccessful complaint to Ofcom that it was unfair and had invaded his privacy; and his former WikiLeaks team in Iceland are also featured.In early 2014 Andrew O'Hagan, the ghost writer of Assange's autobiography, said that Assange was passionate, funny, lazy, courageous, vain, paranoid, moral, and manipulative. In November 2014, Spanish Podemos party leader Pablo Iglesias also gave his support to Assange, calling him an activist and a journalist and criticising his persecution.

2015–2018 
In July 2015, British Member of Parliament Jeremy Corbyn opposed Assange's extradition to the US, and as Labour Party leader in April 2019 said the British government should oppose Assange's extradition to the US "for exposing evidence of atrocities in Iraq and Afghanistan".

In October 2016, James Ball who had previously worked with Assange, wrote that he had a score to settle with Hillary Clinton and wanted to reassert himself on the world stage, but that he wouldn't knowingly have been a tool of the Russian state. That month Pussy Riot member and Courage Foundation advisory board member Nadya Tolokonnikova criticised Assange for his connections to the Russian government.

In 2017, Barrett Brown said that Assange had acted "as a covert political operative" in the 2016 US election, thus betraying WikiLeaks' focus on exposing "corporate and government wrongdoing". He considered the latter to be "an appropriate thing to do", but that "working with an authoritarian would-be leader to deceive the public is indefensible and disgusting". That May, Laura Poitras said he was admirable, brilliant and flawed. In late May 2017, President Moreno said that Assange was a "hacker", but that he respected his human rights and Assange's asylum in the embassy would continue.

2019 and now 
Days before Assange was arrested, the Guardian's editorial board wrote that "it would be wrong to extradite him" and that "He believes in publishing things that should not always be published – this has long been a difficult divide between the Guardian and him. But he has also shone a light on things that should never have been hidden. When he first entered the Ecuadorian embassy he was trying to avoid extradition to Sweden over allegations of rape and molestation. That was wrong. But those cases have now been closed. He still faces the English courts for skipping bail. If he leaves the embassy, and is arrested, he should answer for that, perhaps in ways that might result in deportation to his own country, Australia."

After Assange's arrest in 2019, journalists and commenters debated about if Assange was a journalist. Journalists at the Associated Press, CNN, The Sydney Morning Herald, The LA Times, National Review, The Economist, and The Washington Post argued he was not a journalist. Other journalists at The Independent, The Intercept, the Committee to Protect Journalists, and The Washington Post argued he was a journalist or that his actions were still protected. The Washington Post's editorial board wrote that he was "not a free-press hero" or journalist and that he was "overdue for personal accountability."

In December 2019, Australian journalist Mary Kostakidis said, "I became fascinated at this young, idealistic Australian, very tech-savvy, who developed a way for whistleblowers to upload data anonymously" and that she would be giving "100 per cent of my attention and resources" to his defence. In January 2021, Australian journalist John Pilger stated that, were Assange to be extradited, "no journalist who challenges power will be safe". In November 2022, The Guardian, The New York Times, Le Monde, Der Spiegel and El País published an open letter that said "the US government should end its prosecution of Julian Assange for publishing secrets". The letter did not urge the government to drop the case related to the hacking-related charge, though it said that "some of us are concerned" about it, too.

In 2023, former Trump administration CIA Director Mike Pompeo described Assange in his memoir as "a useful idiot for Russia to exploit." The next month, Louis Menand of New Yorker wrote that "Julian Assange is possibly a criminal. He certainly intervened in the 2016 election, allegedly with Russian help, to damage the candidacy of Hillary Clinton. But top newspaper editors have insisted that what Assange does is protected by the First Amendment, and the Committee to Protect Journalists has protested the charges against him" because the information was genuine.

Honours and awards

Works

Bibliography
Underground: Tales of Hacking, Madness and Obsession on the Electronic Frontier (1997).
Cypherpunks: Freedom and the Future of the Internet. OR Books, 2012. .
When Google Met WikiLeaks. OR Books, 2014. .
The WikiLeaks Files: The World According to The US Empire. By WikiLeaks. Verso Books, 2015.  (with an Introduction by Assange).

Filmography

As himself
 The War You Don't See (2010)
 The Simpsons (2012) (cameo; episode "At Long Last Leave")
 Citizenfour (2014)
 The Yes Men Are Revolting (2014)
 Terminal F/Chasing Edward Snowden (2015)
 Asylum (2016)
 Risk (2016)
 Architects of Denial (2017)
 The New Radical (2017)

See also
 Ola Bini, who was arrested in April 2019 in Ecuador apparently due to his association with Assange and WikiLeaks. He was acquitted of all charges in January 2023.
 Thomas A. Drake, former senior executive of the National Security Agency (NSA), and a whistleblower.
 Jeremy Hammond, who was summoned to appear before a Virginia federal grand jury which was investigating Assange. He was held in civil contempt of court after refusing to testify.
 List of people who took refuge in a diplomatic mission
 List of peace activists
 Lauri Love, who in 2018 won an appeal in the High Court of England against extradition to the United States
 Gary McKinnon, whose extradition to the United States was blocked in 2012 by UK Home Secretary Theresa May
 Stratfor email leak, leaked emails from geopolitical intelligence company Stratfor in which staff discuss strategies for dealing with Assange

Explanatory notes

References

Further reading

Books
 
 Nick Cohen, You Can't Read this Book: Censorship in an Age of Freedom (2012).

Films
 Underground: The Julian Assange Story (2012), Australian TV drama that premiered at the 2012 Toronto International Film Festival.
 Julian (2012), Australian short film about nine-year-old Julian Assange. The film won several awards and prizes.
 The Fifth Estate (2013), American thriller that Assange said was a 'serious propaganda attack' on WikiLeaks and its staff.
 Mediastan (2013), Swedish documentary produced by Assange to challenge The Fifth Estate.
 We Steal Secrets: The Story of WikiLeaks (2013), American documentary.
 Risk (2016), American documentary.
 Hacking Justice (2017), German documentary.
 Ithaka (2021), Australian documentary produced by Assange's brother Gabriel Shipton, which deals with his father's worldwide campaign for Julian's release from prison.

External links

 
 
 

 
1971 births
21st-century Australian male writers
Activists from Melbourne
Articles containing video clips
Australian computer programmers
Australian editors
Australian expatriates in England
Australian founders
Australian libertarians
Australian publishers (people)
Australian whistleblowers
Australia–United States relations
Central Queensland University alumni
Cypherpunks
Freedom of information activists
Hackers
Inmates of HM Prison Belmarsh
Internet activists
Living people
Media critics
Open content activists
People associated with Russian interference in the 2016 United States elections
People associated with the 2016 United States presidential election
People from Townsville
People who lost Ecuadorian citizenship
People with Asperger syndrome
Political party founders
Prisoners and detainees of England and Wales
RT (TV network) people
United Kingdom–United States relations
University of Melbourne alumni
WikiLeaks
Australian criminals
People convicted of cybercrime
Australian people imprisoned abroad